The 1977–78 Cypriot Cup was the 36th edition of the Cypriot Cup. A total of 40 clubs entered the competition. It began on 14 December 1977 with the preliminary round and concluded on 11 June 1978 with the final which was held at GSP Stadium. APOEL won their 10th Cypriot Cup trophy after beating Olympiakos Nicosia 3–0 in the final.

Format 
In the 1977–78 Cypriot Cup, participated all the teams of the Cypriot First Division, the Cypriot Second Division and the Cypriot Third Division.

The competition consisted of six knock-out rounds. In all rounds each tie was played as a single leg and was held at the home ground of the one of the two teams, according to the draw results. Each tie winner was qualifying to the next round. If a match was drawn, extra time was following. If extra time was drawn, there was a replay at the ground of the team who were away for the first game. If the rematch was also drawn, then extra time was following and if the match remained drawn after extra time the winner was decided by penalty shoot-out.

The cup winner secured a place in the 1978–79 European Cup Winners' Cup.

Preliminary round 
In the preliminary round participated 7 teams of the 1977–78 Cypriot First Division, 5 teams of the 1977–78 Cypriot Second Division and 4 teams of the 1977–78 Cypriot Third Division.

First round 
9 clubs from the 1977–78 Cypriot First Division, 10 clubs from the 1977–78 Cypriot Second Division and 5 clubs from the 1977–78 Cypriot Third Division were added.

Second round

Quarter-finals

Semi-finals

Final 

 APOEL: G. Pantziaras (75' Koupanos), Menelaou, Stephanou, Stavrou, N. Pantziaras, Stephanis, Miamiliotis (75' Ermogenidis), K. Pantziaras, P. Chatzithomas, Markou, Antoniou.
 Olympiacos: Barnabas, Papageorgiou, Lucas, Georgiou, Faketti, Aristidou, Mario (70' Ethimiadis), Kalotheou, Koulis (23' Bouras), Mavris, Savvidis.

Sources 
 
 ΚΟΠ (Magazine), 30 March 2016, p. 72

Bibliography

See also 
 Cypriot Cup
 1977–78 Cypriot First Division

Cypriot Cup seasons
1977–78 domestic association football cups
1977–78 in Cypriot football